Bishan Depot is a depot located on the Mass Rapid Transit in Bishan, Singapore. It was completed in 1986 by American architect Vikas M. Gore and the 12,000 square metres maintenance area at cost of S$300 million.

The depot comprises a storage yard with a capacity of 59 trains and has an area of 300,000 m2. The depot also houses a central maintenance facility with train overhaul facilities for trains on the North South line operated by SMRT. Bishan depot previously provided maintenance work for the East West line too, prior to the opening of the Tuas Depot. It also acts as a training centre for newly recruited staff, and is where the faregate operation department is located. The depot is located between Ang Mo Kio station and Bishan station on the North South line and has 3 reception tracks: 2 tracks northbound towards Ang Mo Kio station and 1 track southbound towards Bishan station.

Installation and Upgrading Shed
The rolling stock workshop and Tracks 10–12, built enclosed are where various programmes are conducted. Only five trains can undergo installation works during each 3- to 18-week period.
Refurbishment of C151 sets (from 2006 to 2008 as well as 2010 to 2013). Prior to the opening of Pioneer and Joo Koon, there were 94 trains in service at each time. It was increased to 96 in 2010, and finally to 106 in 2012.
Upgrading the signalling system (from 2014 to 2016) in all trains. It had increased the total cohort to 120 in 2014.

The majority of the C151Bs and all of the C151Cs are housed here.

History
Nishimatsu-Lum Chang Joint Venture had won the contract 101 on 8 September 1984.

On 4 July 1985, there was a MRT mishap where four workers were trapped within 15 minutes. The MRT had built rail tracks for testing trains in 1986 - 1987.

On 11 February 2007, SMRT Organised the SMRT Cram Jam! cum Learning Journey and Charity Bazaar to raise funds for the SMRT Silver Tribute Fund. The Cram Jam took place in the morning seeking an entry into the Singapore Book of Records by cramming people inside a standard Kawasaki C151 car (car used: 2027), a Mercedes O405G Hispano Habit bus (bus registered: TIB1202K) and a Ssangyong Rodius/Stavic MPV cab. The Singapore Police Force crammed 550 officers inside the train car, 235 staff from SMRT were crammed inside the bus and 44 Girl Guides Singapore cadets crammed themselves into the cab. Games, carnival food and a 90-minute tour around the Bishan Depot were organised.

A C751B MRT train was vandalised in an apparent security breach at Bishan Depot on 17 August 2011. The train was then put into service before the vandalism was discovered. The Land Transport Authority subsequently fined SMRT S$200,000 for failing to detect, in a timely manner, the graffiti on the train. On 15 July 2016, local and Australian media reported that between April and July 2015, two Americans Jim Harper and Danielle Bremner, posted a series of vandalism videos online under the pseudonyms Utah and Ether, with one video showing them committing the act at Bishan depot. Harper was arrested and jailed 6-months in May in Melbourne, Australia, while his partner is on the run.

Another incident of a MRT train being vandalized happened on a C151A set on 5 May 2014. Police reports were made in the early hours of the morning when trains were being dispatched from the depot.

A third case of vandalism took place on 8 November 2014 when two Germans, Andreas Von Knorre and Elton Hinz, spraypainted a cabin on a C151 train after breaking into the depot. They were each sentenced to nine months jail and given three strokes of the cane as per the Vandalism Act.

A technical officer working at the depot died as a result of his injuries sustained while operating a hydraulic press machine in the rolling stock shed on the morning of 23 March 2020. Following the accident, SMRT imposed a safety time-out and suspended maintenance works during the investigation period.

References

See also

1987 establishments in Singapore
Mass Rapid Transit (Singapore) depots
Buildings and structures in Bishan, Singapore
Transport in Central Region, Singapore